This article lists political parties in Samoa.
, Samoa has 6 officially recognized political parties, the ruling Fa'atuatua i le Atua Samoa ua Tasi (FAST) party, the Human Rights Protection Party (HRPP), the Tautua Samoa Party, the Samoa First Party, and the Samoa National Democratic Party. In May 2020 a fifth party, the Tumua ma Puleono, registered for the elections, and in July 2020, the Fa'atuatua i le Atua Samoa ua Tasi did as well to challenge the longstanding HRPP, which had been in power since 1982.

Despite political parties being present in the country, ideologies and manifestos remain relatively fluid, with local connections and matai holding great/more influence in convincing voters to support a particular candidate over party affiliation in many circumstances.

The parties

Parties represented in the Fono
Human Rights Protection Party (HRPP)
Faatuatua i le Atua Samoa ua Tasi (FAST)

Other parties
 Tautua Samoa Party (TSP)
 Samoa First Party
 Samoa National Democratic Party
 Sovereign Independent Samoa Party (SIS)
 Tumua ma Puleono

Defunct parties
Christian Democratic Party (Samoa) (CDP)
Samoa All People's Party (SAPP)
Samoan Democratic United Party (SDUP)
Samoa Liberal Party (SLP)
Samoa National Party (SNP)
Samoa Party (SP)
Samoan Conservative Progressive Party (SCPP)
Samoan National Development Party (SNDP)
Samoa Progressive Political Party (SPP)
Samoan United Independents Political Party (SUIPP)
Samoan United People's Party
Temokalasi Samoa Fa'amatai (Samoan Democracy of Matai) (TSFPP)
The Christian Party (CP)
The People's Party (TPP)
United Samoa People’s Party (USPP)
Western Samoa Labour Party (WSLP)

See also
 Politics of Samoa
 List of political parties by country

References

Samoa
Politics of Samoa
 
Political parties
Political parties
Samoa